The 33rd Republican People's Party Ordinary Convention was held on 22 and 23 May 2010 in order to elect a new leader following the resignation of Deniz Baykal after a sex-tape scandal. The only candidate was former CHP parliamentary group leader Kemal Kılıçdaroğlu, who was both nominated and unanimously elected with a record share of the delegates' votes.

Baykal initially had considered re-running for election due to strong support from the party's central executive committee, but the lack of support from the local party association chairpersons resulted in him withdrawing from the leadership race. While Kılıçdaroğlu received the support of 77 out of the 81 provincial chairpersons, Baykal received the endorsement of the remaining four. A total of 1,250 delegates were registered for election, with Kılıçdaroğlu receiving 1,189 (with 8 invalid votes).

Party council

Directly elected
Members elected to the Party Council are as follows, with the number of votes they received shown in brackets.

Oya Araslı (1091)
Necla Arat (1100)
Metin Arifağaoğlu (1108)
Yücel Artantaş (1092)
Deniz Pınar Atılgan (1102)
Sencer Ayata (1113)
Işık Bildacı Ayata (1112)
Enver Aysever (1112)
Aydan Baran (1111)
Süheyl Batum (1108)
Gülsün Bilgehan (1110)
Tekin Bingöl (1096)
Mevlüt Coşkuner (1112)
Behçet Çağlar (1112)
Asuman Çakmakçı (1110)
Hikmet Çelik (1098)
Soner Çetin (1110)
İzzet Çetin (1097)
Mesut Değer (1030)
Mahmut Duyan (1105)
Didem Engin (1109)
Nevin Gaye Erbatur (1097)
Ali Rıza Ertemur (1112)
Abdurrezzak Erten (1094)
Mehmet Faraç (1113)
Neriman Genç (1111)
İsa Gök (1094)
Gökhan Günaydın (1100)
Mehmet Zeki Gündüz (1113)
Hurşit Güneş (1109)
Hülya Güven (1109)
Mehmet Kaban (1111)
Sait Korkmaz Karaca (1107)
Eşref Karaibrahim (1111)
Hüseyin Karakoç (1111)
Haluk Koç (1107)
Nihat Matkap (1104)
Şahin Mengü (1110)
Rıfat Nalbantoğlu (1091)
Hakkı Suha Okay (1103)
Kerem Ekrem Oktay (1095)
Melda Onur (1108)
Umut Oran (1105)
Oğuz Oyan (1082)
Ensar Öğüt (1091)
Malik Ecder Özdemir (1114)
Abdullah Özer (1114)
İhsan Özkes (1063)
Mehmet Ali Özpolat (1108)
Faik Öztrak (1080)
Atilla Sav (1080)
Önder Sav (978)
Çetin Soysal (1084)
Murat Fehmi Sönmez (1111)
Mehmet Süne (1105)
Veli Gündüz Şahin (1102)
Halide Jale Tamzok (1109)
Semra Tanülkü (1113)
Fatma Füsun Tatlıdil (1113)
Gürsel Tekin (814)
Cahide Tunç (1106)
Ayhan Yalçınkaya (1107)
Hüseyin Yaşar (1107)
Azmi Yıldız (1109)
İrfan Hüseyin Yıldız (1102)
Nuran Yıldız (1109)
Sacid Yıldız (1101)
Alaattin Yüksel (1096)

Science, culture, and executive quota
Members elected to the Party Council through the science, culture and executive quota are as follows, with the number of votes they received shown in brackets.

Engin Altay (835)
Ufuk Ataç (797)
Berhan Şimşek (751)
Turgut Dibek (744)
Osman Coşkunoğlu (743)
Rıza Yalçınkaya (736)
Seyhan Erdoğdu (727)
Ali Koçal (717)
Derviş Günday (711)
Sema Kendirci (702)
Faruk Demir (680)
Birgen Keleş (514)

High disciplinary board

Polat Akbulut
Mehmet Boztaş
Kemal Cengizoğlu
Avni Çelebi
Göksel Demirtaş
Gökhan Durgun
Orhan Eraslan
Selçuk Eratkuş
Füsun Gökçe
Selahattin Öcal
Murat Haluk Öncel
Seyit Özanarat
Türkan Öztekin
Saliha Ülkü
İbrahim Yılmaz

Leadership
A candidate for the leadership needed the signatures of 20% of the registered delegates to officially run for election.

Candidates
Kemal Kılıçdaroğlu, parliamentary group leader and CHP Member of Parliament since 2002. Received 1,246 nominations.
Deniz Baykal, three-time leader of the CHP and former government minister. Stood down as a candidate before the election.

Results

References

2010 in Turkey
Ordinary Conventions of the Republican People's Party (Turkey)
2010 conferences